The Lowland and Border Pipers' Society was formed in the early 1980s, to promote the study and playing of cauld-wind (bellows-blown) bagpipes of Northern England and south-east Scotland, such as the Scottish smallpipes, pastoral pipes, and border pipes.  The organisation holds events and competitions, supplies instructional materials, and publishes a journal, Common Stock.  The title of the journal refers to the array of drones on Lowland bagpipes, which are grouped together in a "common stock" rather than separately attached to the bag, such as on the Great Highland bagpipe. The society has played a key role in the success of the revival of the bellows bagpipe traditions of Scotland.

References

External links
Official site

Bagpipe societies
Scottish music
English music
Music organisations based in the United Kingdom